Balussery State assembly constituency is one of the largest 140 state legislative assembly constituencies in Kerala state in southern India. It is also one of the 7 state legislative assembly constituencies included in the Kozhikode Lok Sabha constituency. Since May 2021 assembly elections, K M Sachin Dev of CPI(M), is MLA from Balussery preceded by Purushan Kadalundy.

Local self-governed segments
Balussery Assemby Constituency is composed of the following local self governed segments:

Members of Legislative Assembly 
The following list contains all members of Kerala legislative assembly who have represented the constituency:

Key

Election Results

Niyamasabha Election 2021 
There were 2,24,239 registered voters in the constituency for the 2021 election.

Niyamasabha Election 2016 
There were 2,09,667 registered voters in the constituency for the 2016 election.

Niyamasabha Election 2011 
There were 1,85,109 registered voters in the constituency for the 2011 election.

See also 
 Balussery
 Kozhikode district
 List of constituencies of the Kerala Legislative Assembly
 2016 Kerala Legislative Assembly election

References 

Assembly constituencies of Kerala

State assembly constituencies in Kozhikode district